Purampokku Engira Podhuvudamai is a 2015 Indian Tamil-language political thriller film co-produced, written and directed by S. P. Jananathan, which stars Arya, Shaam, Vijay Sethupathi, and Karthika. Also produced by UTV Motion Pictures, the film features cinematography by N. K. Ekambaram and a score by Srikanth Deva, while the soundtrack was composed by newcomer Varshan. The film, which was earlier titled Purampokku, a term used for a piece of land that is common to all, revolves around the relevance of capital punishment in a democratic and free society. The film released on 15 May 2015 to mixed reviews. It also marked Karthika's last official acting performance, as she'd cited of not enjoying acting much and a bright chance to mark her future endeavours.

Plot

The film begins with a narration on how India has been turned into a landfill site for domestic and foreign countries, with the countries dumping even ammunition waste on Indian soil.

In Delhi, Balusamy aka Balu, a communist leader who is convicted by the court on counts of robbery, murder, and treason is given the death sentence. Despite Balu's request to execute him as a martyr by shooting, the court orders that he be hanged within a month's time by a professional executioner or hangman. He is escorted to a high security prison complex in Chennai by Macaulay, an honest, law-abiding police officer who is given the charge of monitoring him until his execution. The prison provides freedom to all prisoners, including Balu, to do whatever they want, as long as they do not cause unrest. Balu is instantly admired by the inmates for his patriotism and philosophy, as well as his empathy with the inmates. They view him as a spokesperson to the prison officials on behalf of them.

Meanwhile, Macaulay searches for a hangman and learns of Yamalingam, an executioner who has had a disdain of execution since his teens due to remorse of hanging an innocent man who was wrongly accused. Macaulay tries to convince Yamalingam to carry out the duty of executing Balu, to which he agrees after much coercion by Macaulay that Balu is a convict. Yamalingam is given a special phone tuned to a certain frequency where Macaulay can contact him.

Elsewhere, Kuyili, Balu's trusted comrade, learns about his conviction and assembles a group of computer hackers] to hack into the prison's surveillance system. She befriends Yamalingam and uses him as a messenger to convey their escape plan to Balu. Kuyili also explains to Yamalingam that Balu was a communist leader in North India who wanted to prevent India from turning into a landfill site. To justify his actions, Balu took to violence and tried suicide bombing the Indian Army but failed due to Kuyili's reluctance to kill him. He was apprehended and jailed in Delhi. Kuyili tells Yamalingam that her refusal to kill Balu and his past guilt of executing an innocent person were the reasons that made them allies.

Yamalingam becomes impressed by Balu's ideologies and decides to stop Balu from being executed. He requests Macaulay to meet Balu in person, to which he agrees. Yamalingam makes a mannequin based on Balu's likeness, to test the rope for hanging, with Balu conveying the escape plan to him, unknown to Macaulay, through a sheet of paper. Soon, with the help of two inmates, Balu escapes from jail in the place of a South African convict, but he surrenders upon seeing the convict being battered by the police. Macaulay and the police beat Balu up and lock him up in a secured prison cell, chained. Kuyili disguises herself as a fiancee of Balu and visits him in prison to convey the escape plan to him in Sanskrit. She later devises a plan with Yamalingam to aid Balu's escape at the execution chamber.

Meanwhile, Macaulay learns that Yamalingam has been in contact with Kuyili but decides to deal with him after Balu's execution. He holds a press conference along with the government officials allotting the date of Balu's execution, but changes plans that night by detaining the officials, including Yamalingam and seizing their phones until Balu is executed the day before the officially announced date, while enforcing strict security around the prison premises with the help of soldiers. Macaulay goes to Balu's cell and takes him out into the prison ground where he tells him of his execution date as a prisoner's right to information. He also discusses with Balu on the irony that how he was looked upon as a traitor by the public despite his crusade for the people, to which Balu retorts by saying that the police works for a corrupt government. Macaulay informs Balu that Yamalingam had been in contact with Kuyili and sends a message to Yamalingam's phone as Kuyili to assure him that they know the changed date of the execution. He tells Balu that no one would come to save him but asks if he was valiant enough to give up his life as a martyr, to which Balu replies that he see it for himself at the execution chamber.

On the day of his execution, Balu delivers a speech saying that Indian people have the rights to their own land and they should not allow foreign countries to abuse it. Yamalingam looks at Balu's eyes and winks at him, assuring him that he shall escape, covers his face and places the noose on him, then proceeds to hang him, being tensed after the process. Unbeknownst to Yamalingam, Kuyili had not been informed of the execution. When Balu's body is retrieved from the trapdoor, Yamalingam becomes remorseful and demands the officials that he keep the body, but to no avail. Balu's body is cremated at the prison complex by Macaulay and the police. Yamalingam mentally breaks down, out of guilt of executing Balu and carries the mannequin he made earlier and sees it as Balu himself. Kuyili, upon hearing Balu's execution, leaves India with her comrades on a boat. Some years later, Yamalingam, now a beggar with mental illness, converses with Balu's mannequin on a railway track and tells it the impact of Balu's ideology on the public, then salutes it as the film ends.

Cast

 Arya as Balusamy
 Shaam as Macaulay
 Vijay Sethupathi as Yamalingam
 Karthika as Kuyili
 Rama as Yamalingam's mother
 Krishnamoorthy as Chellakunjan
 Bharathi Murugesh as Vedigundu
 Naveen as Naathampidichavan
 Sri Vetri as Vetri
 TSK as Saravanakumar
 Vishwa Kumar as Vishwa
 Udayabhanu as a prisoner
 Annadurai Kannadasan as himself
 Yaar Kannan as himself

Production

Development
Three years after his last directorial Peranmai (2009), Jananathan announced that his next directorial would feature Jiiva and Jayam Ravi, who both starred in Jananathan's earlier films, playing lead roles. Yuvan Shankar Raja was reported to be the composer of the film, which was to begin in mid-January 2013. Since the actors were busy with other commitments, the project failed to take off. In 2013, Jananathan announced the project titled Purampokku with Arya and Vijay Sethupathi in lead roles, with newcomer Varshan handling the music direction instead of Yuvan Shankar Raja and N. K. Ekambaram wielding the camera.

Casting
Jananathan revealed that the film would be a political action thriller with Arya portraying role as a social and financial analyst, while Vijay Sethupathi would appear as a railway Khalasi.  Posters released from the production unit revealed Arya with a resemblance of Bhagat Singh. In December 2013, Karthika was signed to play the lead female role. Her role was said to be an action-packed one where she would perform her stunt sequences herself. As part of her role, she learnt how to ride a motorcycle. Jananathan stated that though there are two heroes in the film, there will be just one heroine. Later Shaam, who earlier appeared in director's debut film Iyarkai (2003), was selected to play the role of police officer. A promotional photo-shoot with Arya, Vijay Sethupathi, and Shaam was held in December.

Filming
Principal photography of the film started on 11 January 2014 in Kulu Manali. The film was shot extensively around Himachal Pradesh, Rajasthan and Chennai. When filming an emotional scene involving Shaam and Vijay Sethupathi, Jananathan shot the scene in a unique way such that he allowed the actors to enact the entire sequence at one stretch. Though it was tough to shoot, the method ensured that the improvisations the actors had in mind were implemented on the spot. Later, the director broke the sequence into shots and got exactly what he wanted and made the actors enact certain portions again. The shooting was postponed for a while in June 2014 as the lead actors went to complete their other projects. The lead actors had to learn to ride a camel for a few scenes in the film shot in Jaisalmer. Arya had to perform the risky stunt of running on top of a moving train in an important sequence in the film. A huge prison set was erected in Chennai where an extensive 45-day production schedule was shot with the lead actors of the film. On 4 August 2014, the shooting of the film was temporarily cancelled by the production unit and joined the protest declared by the Tamil Nadu Film Director's union against the Government of Sri Lanka's army for writing articles on their official website degrading the then Chief Minister of Tamil Nadu, J. Jayalalitha. The principal photography of the film was completed on 17 December 2014.

Soundtrack

The songs are composed by debutant Varshan, while the background score was composed by Srikanth Deva. The lyrics are written by Parinaman, Vijay Sagar and Na. Muthukumar.

Release
The teaser of the film was released on 15 August 2014 in theatres across the country. The trailer of the film was released on 4 February 2015 in theaters and social media platforms. The film was listed in the "Top 10 most anticipated films of 2014". The film released on 15 May 2015 alongside Jyothika's 36 Vayadhinile. Star Vijay were acquires for the television rights of this film.

Critical reception
The film received highly mixed reviews, with praise for Arya and Vijay Sethupathi's performance, while Shaam's portrayal of a police officer was regarded as the film's highlight. But criticized  the title of the film. A critic from The Hindu wrote, "The greatness of Purampokku lies not in the fact that it takes complex issues such as death penalty and privatisation to create a superb, entertaining film. On the contrary, Purampokku provides a blue print – evidence, if you like – for filmmakers to show how one can deal with controversial topics without watering down the complexity of the issue or settling for a silly compromise". A critic from The Times of India gave the film 3 stars out of 5 and wrote, "Jhananthan takes his own sweet time to get to the crux of the story, spending too much time on songs and establishing the grandness of the prison set, but once the plot gets moving, Purampokku is completely engaging. That the director manages to make it a solid political commentary and also an effective thriller at once is an accomplishment". A critic from The New Indian Express wrote, "Informative and entertaining, Purampokku... is one film where the characters and moments linger in the mind, even after one leaves the theatre". A critic from Rediff gave the film 3 stars out of 5 and wrote, "Purampokku Engira Podhuvudamai is an honest and compelling political thriller that debates the arbitrary nature of capital punishment against the backdrop of a communist revolution".

A critic from Sify, however, wrote, "SP Jananathan's dialogues are splendid, he casually spill all his communism ideologies in every possible scenes but as the concept of the film itself is universal, the execution should have been top notch and flawless but here things are progressively poor and amateurish".

Controversies
In August 2013, cinematographer Natarajan Subramanian claimed that he had already registered the title Purampokku for a future film, and claiming that he did not give anyone permission to use the title, threatened to take legal action against anyone who did so. In November 2013, UTV Motion Pictures confirmed that the title Purampokku will be retained for the film as confirmed by the South Indian Film Chamber, Tamil Film Producers Council and Film & Television Producers's Guild. However, the film was later retitled Purampokku Engira Podhuvudamai, with the director saying, "the word 'Purampokku' has become abusive today...the title was needed to stress upon the forgotten fact that everything is common for all".

References

External links
 
 

2015 films
2010s Tamil-language films
Indian prison films
Indian drama films
Films set in prison
2010s prison films
Fictional portrayals of the Tamil Nadu Police
UTV Motion Pictures films
Films shot in Himachal Pradesh
Films shot in Rajasthan
Films shot in Chennai
Films set in Chennai
Films scored by Srikanth Deva
Films directed by S. P. Jananathan